Sulevkent is a rural locality (a selo) in Khasavyurtovsky District, Republic of Dagestan, Russia. The population was 2,665 as of 2010. There are 22 streets.

Geography 
Sulevkent is located 33 km northeast of Khasavyurt (the district's administrative centre) by road. Kutan Butush is the nearest rural locality.

References 

Rural localities in Khasavyurtovsky District